Bent Patey (born 12 June 1952 in Oslo, Norway) is an English-Norwegian guitarist, composer and writer. He grew out of the environment around Club 7, and with a background in groups like Bazar, Susanne Fuhr Band, Lotus and Bryggerigangen Bluesband.

Biography 
Patey has contributed on more than 40 albums. In the 1980s he toured Norway with his own band PATEYs PIPE. Together with the keyboarder  Brynjulf Blix, bassist Geir Holmsen and drummer Bjørn Jenssen as the first lineup. Later many other renown Norwegian artists have been on the list.

Discography (in selection)

Solo albums 
1982: Ocean Front Walk (EMI), nominated for the Spellemannprisen as this years composer, including with Sidsel Endresen, Lynni Treekrem, Sigurd Køhn, Morten Halle, Torbjørn Sunde, Jon Christensen

Collaborations 
With Bazar
1974: Drabantbyrock (Plateselskapet Mai)

With Bryggerigangen Bluesband
1979: Blått Brygg (Plateselskapet Mai)

With Bang 85
1985: The Further You Go (Spider Records), with Håkon Iversen, Brynjulf Blix, Øivind Madsen, Paolo Vinaccia among others

References

External links 
PATEYs PIPE

Norwegian jazz composers
Norwegian jazz guitarists
1952 births
Living people
Norwegian people of English descent